Jörg Emmerich (born 9 March 1974) is a German former professional footballer who last was sporting director of Chemnitzer FC.

References

External links

1974 births
Living people
Sportspeople from Halle (Saale)
People from Bezirk Halle
German footballers
Association football midfielders
Footballers from Saxony-Anhalt
Hallescher FC players
FC Rot-Weiß Erfurt players
FC Erzgebirge Aue players
Chemnitzer FC players
VfL Halle 1896 players
2. Bundesliga players